Kowalewice  is a village in the administrative district of Gmina Parzęczew, within Zgierz County, Łódź Voivodeship, in central Poland.

Massacre during Second World War

During the German Invasion of Poland in 1939, German forces on 11 September murdered 23 Poles in the village.

References

Villages in Zgierz County
Massacres in Poland
Germany–Poland relations
Nazi war crimes in Poland